Aare is an Estonian masculine given name meaning "treasure" in the Estonian language.

People named Aare include:
Aare Heinvee (born 1956), politician
Aare Laanemets (1954–2000), actor and stage director
Aare Laht (born 1948), chemist
Aare Leikola (1893–1973), Finnish engineer, business executive and politician
 (born 1970), organist and musical pedagogue
Aare Mäemets (1929–2002), biologist and ecologist
Aare Pilv (born 1976), poet
 (born 1960), cellist

References

Estonian masculine given names